In English football, the Second City derby or Birmingham derby, is the local derby between the two major clubs in the city of Birmingham – Aston Villa and Birmingham City, first contested in 1879. It is known as the Second City Derby based on Birmingham being referred to as the second city of the United Kingdom. The two clubs are generally regarded as each other's most fierce rivals. In addition both sides have affiliated women's sides, Aston Villa W.F.C. and Birmingham City W.F.C.

History 

The clubs first met on 27 September 1879, when Birmingham City were called Small Heath Alliance. The game, on a pitch at Small Heath's Muntz Street ground described by the Villa players as "only suitable for pot-holing", finished 1–0 – recorded as "one goal and a disputed goal to nil" – to the home side. Villa won the first competitive game between the clubs, in the Second Round of the FA Cup at Wellington Road in 1887, by four goals to nil, and their first league encounter, in the First Division in the 1894–95 season, 2–1.

The two teams have engaged in several hotly contested matches. In the 1925 league game at Villa Park, with the home side 3–0 ahead with eleven minutes to go, Blues scored three times in a dramatic final spell to draw the match. The following year, Aston Villa made headlines with the signing of Tom 'Pongo' Waring, and his first appearance was for the reserves against Birmingham City's reserves, which famously drew a crowd of 23,000. Waring scored three times in the match.

The most significant clash was the final of the 1963 League Cup, which was staged not long after Aston Villa had beaten Birmingham City 4–0 in the league. Blues won 3–1 on aggregate over the two-legged final to claim their first major domestic honour.

During the late 1970s to early 1980s both Villa and Blues met regularly in the First Division and both teams had some memorable successes in the fixture. In 1980–81 Villa did the double over Blues and went on to win the First Division title. Blues scored a memorable 3–0 victory at St Andrew's in the first meeting following Villa's European Cup triumph in 1982. Both teams promptly went into decline. Blues racked up a 3–0 win in a relegation battle at Villa Park in March 1986 but were relegated at the end of that season. Villa would be demoted the following campaign. The next time Villa met Blues in a league fixture at Villa Park again was in the Second Division and saw a 2–0 Blues victory. The reverse fixture at St Andrew's was a 2–1 Villa victory with both goals coming from Garry Thompson. The two sides would only meet again in the 1980s in cup competitions. Villa won 7–0 on aggregate when they clashed twice in the 1988–89 League Cup. The same season Villa also won a Full Members Cup clash 6–0.

The Premier League Era
Following the creation of the Premier League, Aston Villa and Birmingham City met twice in the second round of the 1993–94 League Cup. Villa won both matches 1–0. The game at St Andrew's was settled by a Kevin Richardson goal after his keeper Mark Bosnich had saved a penalty from John Frain to keep the game at 0–0. The second leg at Villa Park was notable for a winning goal from Villa's Dean Saunders and a red card for Blues' Paul Tait. Villa went on to win the trophy.

Blues' promotion to the Premier League in 2002 saw fans eagerly anticipating the first league derbies in 15 years. Blues won both derbies 3–0 and 2–0, respectively. Both matches saw goalkeeping errors by Villa goalkeeper Peter Enckelman, including a goal scored directly from an Olof Mellberg throw-in. Violence between both sets of fans occurred before both matches as evening kick-off times had allowed fans to get drunk over the course of the day. In March 2003, during the game at Villa Park, two Villa players were sent off, Dion Dublin for a head-butt on Blues' Robbie Savage and Joey Guðjónsson for a reckless two-footed tackle on Matthew Upson. Trouble also took place following the game on Witton Lane outside Villa Park, where missiles were hurled at police who were attempting to keep both sets of fans apart.

The 2003–04 Premiership season saw games ending in 0–0 and 2–2 draws. The 2–2 draw saw Blues recover a two-goal deficit thanks to a 90th-minute equaliser from Stern John. Both games were lunchtime kick-offs to avoid drunken behaviour, which was achieved although the games lost none of their passionate edge. The following season Blues got back to winning ways, with 2–1 victory at Villa Park just before Christmas and 2–0 at home in March, Villa keeper Thomas Sørensen making mistakes in both matches, though it's debatable if his errors directly affected the respective results. In the 2005–06 Premiership Season, Villa finally beat Blues in the Premiership, thanks to a Kevin Phillips goal. This was followed up by another Villa victory on 16 April 2006, Easter Sunday, with Aston Villa winning 3–1 thanks to two goals from Milan Baroš and a bicycle kick from Gary Cahill. Blues were relegated in 2006 but subsequently promoted in 2007.

In November 2007, Villa won their third consecutive derby match with a 2–1 victory at St Andrew's. Former Villa defender Liam Ridgewell scored an own goal to put Villa 1–0 up, Blues equalised through Mikael Forssell only for Gabriel Agbonlahor to clinch it with a late header for Villa, having cleared off his own line seconds before. Violent clashes took place outside the ground after the game in which over 20 police officers were hurt. The derby on 20 April 2008 between the two sides ended in a 5–1 win for Aston Villa at Villa Park, the biggest winning margin for either side in a league match for 40 years.

Villa continued their winning ways in the derby, when they won both of the meetings between the clubs in the 2009–10 Premier League season. The first took place on 13 September 2009 at St Andrew's, and ended 1–0 to Aston Villa, with Agbonlahor scoring the winner in the 85th minute, once again there was trouble with 14 arrests. Villa then went on to beat Blues 1–0 at Villa Park thanks to a disputed penalty from James Milner in the 82nd minute. This was the 3rd time in 4 derbies that Villa had scored the winning goal in the final 10 minutes of the game. Villa also possess the record of six straight wins from 1987 to 1993, including five cup matches. This record was then achieved in the Premier League after Villa beat Blues 1–0 on 25 April 2010, setting a record of six straight league wins from 2005 to 2010. The record was finally ended at the next derby match on 31 October 2010, which resulted in a 0–0 draw at Villa Park. The return match at St Andrew's also ended in a draw, with it finishing 1–1.

In those games in October and December 2010 where Aston Villa played Birmingham City, at Villa Park (Premier League, 31 October) and St Andrew's (League Cup, 1 December, which was the first mid-week game between the two sides since 2003) violence between the two sets of supporters and hooligan firms occurred, with many fans being arrested. In the first game, there were scenes of violence outside Villa Park and there were a small amount of arrests including a Birmingham City club chef. In the second of the two games (and larger scale violence) after Blues had beaten Villa 2–1, Blues supporters came onto the pitch and confronted the visiting Villa fans, this resulted in flares, ripped out seats and other missiles being hurled by Villa fans into the Blues supporters, there were also flash points before and after the game including the attack on a Blues supporters pub by Villa hooligans, the events were described as a "warzone" by a supporter who attended the game. Birmingham City were later fined £40,000 by the Football Association for failing to control their fans.

On 10 April 2011, an episode of Police Academy UK, a TV show aired on BBC Three which documents overseas police officers' introduction to British crime and policing, was set in Birmingham and covered the violence that occurred at the game between Birmingham City and Aston Villa on 1 December 2010.

On 17 June 2011, Birmingham City manager Alex McLeish swapped Blues for Villa in a move that shocked the football world. The reaction from both sets of supporters was one of anger. Blues supporters were angry at McLeish, who guided them to only their second ever major trophy win in February 2011, for betraying them to join bitter rivals Villa, and Villa fans were unhappy with the appointment of a manager that had got Blues relegated twice in four seasons, and was perceived to play a negative style of football; that he came from Blues only served to rub salt into the wound of the board making such an unambitious and negative appointment. Several hundred Villa supporters protested at Villa Park when it emerged that Villa owner Randy Lerner has begun talks with McLeish. McLeish received death threats from followers of both teams following his appointment as Aston Villa manager. This controversial move only increased tension and hostility between the players, supporters and owners of both clubs even more as Blues directors threatened legal action against Villa for allegedly "tapping up" McLeish, who resigned as Blues manager on 12 June 2011, while he was still under contract at Birmingham City. McLeish's appointment marked the first time in history that a manager had moved directly from Birmingham City to Aston Villa. On 14 May 2012, one day after the 2011–12 Premier League season ended, McLeish was sacked as Villa manager after a massively disappointing one season in charge.

The EFL Championship Era

After being relegated in 2011, Birmingham are still yet to gain promotion back to the top flight of English football. However, since Alex McLeish was sacked as Villa manager, Villa's poor form continued. Despite several manager changes over the next few years, after several close calls they were finally relegated at the end of the 2015/16 season. Earlier on in the 2015/16 season, the two teams were drawn to play each other in the third round of the League Cup. Aston Villa ran out 1–0 winners thanks to a goal from Rudy Gestede. 
In the 2016–17 season the two teams faced off in the second tier of English football for the first time since 1987. The first game at St Andrew's ended in a 1–1 draw. Villa won the second match 1–0 with a 69th-minute goal scored by Agbonlahor. The two sides faced each other again in the league during the 2017/18 season, producing a dismal 0–0 draw at St. Andrews marred by Birmingham fans throwing clappers at the Villa players all throughout the game, before Villa emphatically fortified their second city superiority with a 2–0 victory in front of 41,232 spectators at Villa Park. Some fans believed this game to be a coming of age for lifelong Villa fan and local Jack Grealish, who produced a match-winning man-of-the-match display. 
The teams next met on 25 November in one of the most exciting derby games in recent times, Villa ran out 4-2 winners after goals from Jonathan Kodjia, Jack Grealish, a Tammy Abraham penalty and Alan Hutton who ran half the length of the pitch to score, Pedersen and Lukas Jutkiewicz scored for Birmingham.

On 10 March 2019, a Birmingham City fan invaded the pitch during the reverse fixture at St. Andrew's and assaulted Aston Villa captain Jack Grealish on the pitch by punching him from behind in the head, which was labelled as "disgraceful and cowardly" by supporters of both teams. The man was arrested and charged by West Midlands Police. St Andrew's' security was criticised as a result. The game ended in an ironic twist with a 1–0 win for Aston Villa with Grealish scoring the winning goal. At the end of the same season, Villa were promoted as they won ten in a row including that game. Since then, this fiercely contested fixture hasn't been played between the two rivals.

Women's Sides

Birmingham City W.F.C. were founded in 1968, whilst Aston Villa W.F.C. were founded in 1973 as Solihull F.C., and took on their current Aston Villa guise in 1996. During the 2000-01 and 2001-02 seasons both teams competed in the second tier FA Women's Premier League North. Birmingham were then promoted to the Women's Premier League National with Villa joining them for one season in 2003-04 before being relegated. Then followed 18 years of the teams being in different divisions, Birmingham being in the top tier and Villa elsewhere, until the 2020–21 Women's Super League season when Villa were promoted up to join Blues. In the first ever WSL match between the two sides Birmingham beat Villa 1–0 at an empty Villa Park (due to restrictions related to the COVID-19 pandemic in the United Kingdom), while the Birmingham's home match which was also played behind closed doors at Damson Park, Solihull was a 1–1 draw. In the 2021–22 season, Aston Villa won 1–0 at St. Andrew's. Birmingham returned the favour and won 1–0 at Villa Park on 8 May 2022, the final day of the season, as they were relegated to the FA Women's Championship. 

As of the 2021–22 Birmingham currently play at St Andrew's, home of the men's team, having played at Redditch Utd, Stratford Town and Solihull Moors in the 21st century. Villa play at Walsall's Bescot Stadium, having moved from Boldmere St Michaels - although important games such as the Second City Derby will often take place at Villa Park.

Statistics and records 
As of the end of the 2010–11 season, there have been 120 meetings in major competition between the two teams since the first FA Cup meeting in 1887, of which Aston Villa have won 52 and Birmingham City 38. The most goals in one game were scored in a league game on 7 July 1895, in the First Division, as Small Heath lost to Aston Villa 7–3. The biggest winning margin was 6–0 to Aston Villa on 9 November 1988, in a Full Members Cup fixture. The last Birmingham City league victory over Aston Villa was on 20 March 2005, when Blues won 2–0 at St Andrew's. Villa won six encounters in a row, most recently on 25 April 2010 (2005–2010). The two teams drew for the first time in over six years in the next match (the first of three in the 2010–11 season), with the match finishing 0–0 (the other Premier League match of the season also finished as a draw). The second match of the season resulted in the first Blues win since 2005, as they beat Villa 2–1 in the 2010–11 League Cup Quarter Final on 1 December 2010.

All-time results

Aston Villa in the league at home

Birmingham City in the league at home

Cup matches

Women's matches

Summary of results
Stats correct as of 10 March 2019.

Records

Firsts
First competitive meeting: Aston Villa 4–0 Small Heath Alliance (FA Cup), 5 November 1887.
First league meeting: Aston Villa 2–1 Small Heath, 1 September 1894.
First away victory for Aston Villa: Small Heath 1–4 Aston Villa, 26 October 1895.
First away victory for Birmingham City: Aston Villa 1–3 Birmingham, 20 January 1906.

Results
Highest scoring game: Aston Villa 7–3 Small Heath, 7 September 1895.
Largest winning margin (Aston Villa): 6 goals – 6–0, 9 November 1988.
Largest winning margin (Birmingham City): 4 goals – 4–0, 21 September 1968.

Players
Most goals in a match (Aston Villa):
Most goals in a match (Birmingham City):

Trends
 Most games won in a row (Aston Villa): 6, 16 October 2005 to 25 April 2010.
 Most games won in a row (Birmingham City): 5, 3 April 1976 – 25 February 1978.
 Most games without defeat (Aston Villa): 14, 16 October 2005 – on going
 Most games without defeat (Birmingham City): 6, 8 March 1933 – 23 November 1935 and 16 September 2002 – 20 March 2005.
 Most drawn games in a row: 4, 10 December 1949 – 21 September 1955.
 Whenever the clubs have met in the Premier League the result has always been the same during that particular season: 2002/2003– 2 Blues wins, 2003/2004– 2 draws, 2004/2005– 2 Blues wins, 2005/2006– 2 Villa Wins, 2007/2008– 2 Villa wins, 2009/2010– 2 Villa wins, 2010/11- 2 draws.

Top scorers

The following is a list of the top goal scorers for each team in the fixture. Only players who have scored 4 or more goals feature.

Aston Villa

Birmingham City

Crossing the divide

Players

Unlike, for example, the Old Firm derby, there is no shortage of players who have appeared for both clubs. Villa legend Harry Hampton transferred to Blues after the First World War and helped the club to the Second Division title. The last established first-team player to make this move was Des Bremner in 1984, though there had been loan signings and movement of youth players during this period. The most recent permanent transfer from Aston Villa to Birmingham City was that of Gary Gardner in Summer 2019, his brother Craig was the previous player to move from Villa to Birmingham in 2010. The last player to move directly in the other direction was Spanish Winger Jota in the same transfer window.

Notable players who have been transferred directly between the clubs are listed below.

Aston Villa to Birmingham City

Notes
 The players listed above made a direct transfer from Villa to Blues. In addition, there are several players who have "crossed the divide" but done so via another league club.
 European Cup winner Dennis Mortimer – regarded by Villa fans as one of their greatest ever players – also played for Birmingham City in the 1986/7 season.
 Kevin Phillips played for Villa in the 2005/06 season before moving to Blues in 2008 via West Bromwich Albion.

Birmingham City to Aston Villa

Notes

 The players listed above made a direct transfer from Blues to Villa. In addition, there are several high-profile players who have "crossed the divide" but done so via another league club. Notable examples include former England international Emile Heskey and European Cup winner Peter Withe.
Chris Sutton was released by Birmingham City at the end of the 2005–06 season. His next club was Aston Villa, for whom he signed for in October 2006.
Scott Sinclair has played on loan at both clubs. He was on loan at Birmingham City while he was playing for Chelsea during the 2008–09 season and he was on loan at Aston Villa during the 2014–15 season before signing permanently from Manchester City.

Managers
Former Aston Villa Manager Ron Saunders, who managed Villa to League Cup success in 1975 and again in 1977 before taking the club to its first Championship success for 70 years in 1981, also moved across to Birmingham City following his resignation in 1982.

Alex McLeish's appointment as Aston Villa manager in June 2011 after resigning from Birmingham City five days before was the first time in history a manager has moved from Birmingham City to Aston Villa. The move shocked the football world and increased tension between the two clubs even more.

Former Birmingham City Manager Steve Bruce was appointed Villa manager in 2016.

Aston Villa to Birmingham City

Birmingham City to Aston Villa

Chairmen
Doug Ellis was a director of Birmingham City in the late 1960s before becoming part of a consortium which took over at Aston Villa in 1968.

See also
Aston Villa Hardcore (hooligan firm)
Birmingham Zulu Warriors (hooligan firm)
List of Aston Villa F.C. seasons
List of Birmingham City F.C. seasons
List of Aston Villa F.C. records and statistics
List of Birmingham City F.C. records and statistics

References

Derby
Derby
Sport in Birmingham, West Midlands
England football derbies